Vidadi Rzayev (born 4 September 1967) is a retired football midfielder from Azerbaijan. On 31 August 1996, Rzayev's goal gave to Azerbaijan the first victory ever in European qualifying tournament, when Azerbaijan defeated Switzerland 1–0 in Baku. He currently works for FC Gabala as a scout.

Career statistics

International goals

Honours

Club

Turan Tovuz
Azerbaijan Premier League: 1993–94

Neftchi Baku
Azerbaijan Premier League: 1995–96, 2004–05
Azerbaijan Cup: 1995–96, 2003–04

Kapaz
Azerbaijan Premier League: 1998–99
Azerbaijan Cup: 1999–2000

Shamkir
Azerbaijan Premier League: 2000–01

Individual
Azerbaijani Footballer of the Year: 1996
Azerbaijan Premier League top goalscorer: 1999
CIS Cup best player: 2005

References

External links 
 

1967 births
Living people
Soviet footballers
Azerbaijani footballers
Azerbaijan international footballers
Azerbaijani expatriate footballers
Sportspeople from Ganja, Azerbaijan
Qarabağ FK players
Erzurumspor footballers
FC Akhmat Grozny players
Azerbaijani expatriate sportspeople in Turkey
Azerbaijani expatriate sportspeople in Russia
Expatriate footballers in Turkey
Expatriate footballers in Russia
Turan-Tovuz IK players
AZAL PFK players
Süper Lig players
Association football midfielders
Neftçi PFK players
Soviet Top League players